Adrián Nahuel Martínez is an Argentine, born in Buenos Aires who plays for Sacachispas, mainly as a right back, but can also play right midfield.

Club career

San Lorenzo 
Martínez made his debut on 12 November 2011 for San Lorenzo under Leonardo Carol Madelón, and played well despite the 1–0 defeat to All Boys. He currently plays under coach Ricardo Caruso Lombardi.

U-20 International Career 
Martinez has played in Argentina's national teams from U-15 to U-20's and won two titles in the Argentine youth team in 2010, the Copa Aerosur and the Hexagonal Cordoba International 2010. He came third in the South American Youth Championship held in Peru 2011, he also came 4th in the World Cup U-20 2011 held in Colombia, and came second losing to Mexico (1–0) therefore winning a silver medal in the 2011 Pan American Games held in Mexico.

Style of Play 
Martinez is outstanding on the ball, has quick feet, with a decent cross and can tackle.

Club Statistics

References

External links 
 

1992 births
Living people
Footballers from Buenos Aires
Argentine footballers
Argentina under-20 international footballers
Association football wingers
Argentine Primera División players
San Lorenzo de Almagro footballers
Olimpo footballers
Arsenal de Sarandí footballers
Defensa y Justicia footballers
Guillermo Brown footballers
All Boys footballers
Sacachispas Fútbol Club players
Pan American Games medalists in football
Pan American Games silver medalists for Argentina
Footballers at the 2011 Pan American Games
Medalists at the 2011 Pan American Games